Jawad is one of the 230 Vidhan Sabha (Legislative Assembly) constituencies of Madhya Pradesh state in central India. This constituency came into existence in 1951 as one of the 79 Vidhan Sabha constituencies of the erstwhile Madhya Bharat state.

Overview
Jawad (constituency number 230) is one of the 3 Vidhan Sabha constituencies located in Neemuch district. This constituency covers the entire Jawad tehsil of the district.

Jawad is part of Mandsaur Lok Sabha constituency along with seven other Vidhan Sabha segments, namely, Manasa and Neemuch in this district, Jaora in Ratlam district and Mandsaur, Malhargarh, Suwasra and Garoth in Mandsaur district.

Members of Vidhan Sabha
As a constituency of Madhya Bharat state:
 1951: Badri Datt, Indian National Congress
As a constituency of Madhya Pradesh state:
 1957: Virendra Kumar Sakhlecha, Bharatiya Jana Sangh
 1962: Virendra Kumar Sakhlecha, Bharatiya Jana Sangh
 1967: Virendra Kumar Sakhlecha, Bharatiya Jana Sangh
 1972: Kanhiyalal Nagauri, Indian National Congress (defeated Jana Sangh's Sakhlecha) 
 1977: Virendra Kumar Sakhlecha, Janata Party
 1980: Virendra Kumar Sakhlecha, Bharatiya Janata Party
 1985: Chunnilal Dhakad (Congress), defeated V K Sakhlecha (Rebel BJP / Independent) 
 1990: Duli Chand, Bharatiya Janata Party
 1993: Ghanshyam Patidar, Indian National Congress
 1998: Ghanshyam Patidar (Congress), defeated Sakhlecha who was again a rebel BJP candidate from here
 2003: Omprakash Virendra Kumar Saklecha, Bharatiya Janata Party
 2008: Om Prakash Sakhlecha, BJP 
 2013: Om Prakash Sakhlecha, Bharatiya Janata Party

Election results

1967 Vidhan Sabha
 Virendrakumar (Jana Sangh) : 21,882 votes 
 Jagjeewan (INC) : 18,632

1998 Vidhan Sabha
 Ghanshyam Patidar (INC) : 55,502 votes 
 Virendra Kumar Sakhlecha (IND / BJP Rebel) : 46,609

2003 Vidhan Sabha
 Omprakash Virendra Kumar Saklecha (BJP) : 81,390 votes 
 Ghanshyam Patidar (INC) : 54,765

See also
 Jawad

References

Neemuch district
Assembly constituencies of Madhya Pradesh